Evgeny Evgenievich Vorobiov (Russian: Евгений Евгеньевич Воробьёв) is a Russian chess grandmaster.

Career
In 2007 he tied for 3rd–9th with Dmitry Svetushkin, Vladimir Malakhov, Murtas Kazhgaleyev, Pavel Smirnov, Vladimir Dobrov and Aleksej Aleksandrov in the 3rd Moscow Open tournament. 

Evgeny Vorobiov qualified for the Chess World Cup 2011, where he was defeated by Emil Sutovsky in the first round.

In 2012, Vorobiov won the Vila de Sitges.

References

External links

Evgeny Vorobiov chess-games at 365Chess.com

1976 births
Living people
Russian chess players
Chess grandmasters